Timothy James Ryan (born 10 December 1974) is an English former professional footballer. On 14 November 2018 he was appointed York City Youth Team Manager.

Playing career
Ryan joined Darlington in January 2007 signing from Boston United. He has also played for Doncaster, Southport, Scunthorpe, Boston United and Darlington ahead of his transfer to Chester in July 2009.

In September 2009 Ryan was appointed as caretaker-manager of Chester. After taking charge of a goalless draw at Hayes & Yeading, Ryan became assistant manager to new boss Jim Harvey.

After the winding up of Chester City in February 2010 following their expulsion from the Conference, he joined Stalybridge Celtic in March 2010 alongside his former manager at Chester, Jim Harvey In 2013, he rejoined Buxton as the club's Player/Assistant Manager.

Coaching and managerial career
Ryan had spells as assistant manager at Stalybridge Celtic and Chester City. He was also the assistant-manager at Northern Premier League Premier Division side Buxton for five years until leaving his post in April 2018. In 2013 Ryan was appointed co-ordinator for the Doncaster Rovers academy at the Club Doncaster Sports College.

On 14 November 2018 Ryan was appointed York City Youth Team Manager.

On 17 November 2022, Ryan was appointed York City caretaker manager after John Askey was sacked.

International career
Ryan is also a former England semi-professional international.

Honours

As a player 
Southport
 Lancashire Junior Cup: 1996–97, 1997–98
 Liverpool Senior Cup: 1999

Doncaster Rovers
 Conference National play-off winner: 2002–03
 Football League Division Three: 2003–04

External links

References

1974 births
Living people
English footballers
Footballers from Stockport
Buxton F.C. players
Scunthorpe United F.C. players
Doncaster Rovers F.C. players
Altrincham F.C. players
Southport F.C. players
Peterborough United F.C. players
Boston United F.C. players
Darlington F.C. players
Harrogate Town A.F.C. players
Chester City F.C. players
Stalybridge Celtic F.C. players
Bradford (Park Avenue) A.F.C. players
English Football League players
National League (English football) players
Northern Premier League players
Chester City F.C. managers
English football managers
Association football defenders
York City F.C. non-playing staff